Pancho Alvarez is an American stock car racing driver. A long-time sportsman and modified driver in the state of Florida, he competed in one NASCAR Grand National Series race in his career.

Career
A native of Tampa, Florida, Alvarez won the Florida West Coast Stock Car Championship in 1954. He spent most of his career racing on local tracks in the Tampa Bay Area and Polk County, Florida, although he also raced throughout the Southeast, winning multiple track championships.

Alvarez competed in a single major NASCAR-sanctioned race in his career, racing in the inaugural event of the 1952 NASCAR Grand National season at Palm Beach Speedway on January 20, 1952. Starting 9th in the event, he finished 24th, crashing heavily on the race's 113th lap.

Motorsports career results

NASCAR
(key) (Bold – Pole position awarded by qualifying time. Italics – Pole position earned by points standings or practice time. * – Most laps led.)

Grand National Series

References

External links
 

Living people
Year of birth missing (living people)
Racing drivers from Tampa, Florida
NASCAR drivers